For other places with the same name, see Krzemienica.
For the history of the region, see History of Pomerania.

Krzemienica  (German Steinwald) is a village in the administrative district of Gmina Słupsk, within Słupsk County, Pomeranian Voivodeship, in northern Poland.
 The village has a population of 159.

References

Krzemienica